Antti Siltala (born 14 March 1984) is a Finnish professional volleyball player who has played in Greek, Turkish and Polish leagues. He also plays for the Finland men's national team.

Career

Early career
Siltala moved to Kuortane at age 16 and started training with the Finland youth national team. After one year in Kuortane, he made a contract to the Finland league with Keski-Savon Pateri.

Keski-Savon Pateri
The first season in Keski-Savon Pateri was 2001. He played in Pateri during seasons 2001–2004. After that he made a contract with Pielaveden Sampo, which is one of the best teams in the Finland league.

Pielaveden Sampo
The first season was difficult with Pielaveden Sampo. Last season champion, Sampo played its historical worst season and dropped before the medal games. When half of the season was played, Pielaveden Sampo rented Siltala to the France pro league. He played the end season in the Chaumont team. The second season was good to Siltala and Sampo. They won the Finland Cup Champion and Finland league silver. After the season, the media chose Siltala to be on the Finland league All-Star team.

Noliko Maaseik
After the season, Siltala made a contract with Noliko Maaseik. In Noliko Maaseik he rose to starting line-up and played a good season. He won the Belgium league and Belgium cup. Also, he won CEV-Cup silver and Belgium Supercup silver. The season was a success to Siltala and Noliko Maaseik team.

Aris Thessaloniki
After one season in Noliko Maaseik, Siltala made a contract to the Greece league. There his new team was Aris Thessaloniki, where Finnish volleyball player Jukka Lehtonen also played.

National team
Siltala first played for the Finland men's national volleyball team in 2005. He won with the team the same year that the European league silver lost in the final to Russia. He played at the 2007 European Championships and achieved Finland's best-ever result, fourth place.  He has now played for Finland in more than 100 games.

Achievements
Personal
 Finland league All-Star player 2006
 Finland league best server 2006
 Belgium league best server 2007
 Best Spiker in Belgium league 2007
 Mvp in Belgium league 2007
 Best Receivers in Greek Cup 2009
 Best Spiker in Greek Cup 2009
 Mvp in Turkey League 2009
 Best Receivers in Turkey League 2009
 Best Receivers in France League 2014
 Best server in France League 2014

Club
 CEV-Cup silver 2008
 Belgium Champion 2008
 Belgium Cup-win 2008
 Belgium SuperCup silver 2007
 Finland league silver 2006
 Finland Cup-win 2006

National team
 4.place in European Championships 2007

References

1984 births
Living people
Finnish men's volleyball players
Finnish expatriate sportspeople in Belgium
Finnish expatriate sportspeople in Greece
Finnish expatriate sportspeople in Poland
Finnish expatriate sportspeople in Turkey
Expatriate volleyball players in Belgium
Expatriate volleyball players in Greece
Expatriate volleyball players in Poland
Expatriate volleyball players in Turkey
People from Vieremä
Aris V.C. players
Sportspeople from North Savo